Tiberius Coruncanius (died 241 BC) was a consul of the Roman Republic in 280 BC. As a military commander in that year and the following, he was known for the battles against Pyrrhus of Epirus that led to the expression "Pyrrhic victory". He was the first plebeian Pontifex Maximus, and possibly the first teacher of Roman law to offer public instruction.

Biography
Coruncanius, of plebeian descent, is believed to have hailed from Tusculum.

He was first elected consul in 280 BC with Publius Valerius Laevinus, and led an expedition into Etruria against the Etruscan cities.  When Pyrrhus of Epirus invaded Italia, and defeated the Roman legions of Laevinus at the Battle of Heraclea, Tiberius' legions were recalled to Rome to bolster the defense of Roman territory.

In 254 BC or 253 BC, he was the first plebeian elected Pontifex Maximus, or chief priest of the Roman Republic, which position had been previously monopolized by patricians. He died in 241 BC and was succeeded by Lucius Caecilius Metellus, another plebeian.

Impact
He was the first who publicly professed law (publice professus est), known to be both eloquent and full of knowledge. Like Socrates, he left no writings.

His public legal instruction had the effect of creating a class of legally skilled non-priests (jurisprudentes), a sort of consultancy. After Coruncanius' death, instruction gradually became more formal, with the introduction of books on law beyond the then scant official Roman legal texts.

It is possible that as the first plebeian Pontifex Maximus, Coruncanius allowed members of the public and students of the law of Ancient Rome to attend his consultations tasked with giving legal advice to citizens. These consultations were probably held outside the College of Pontiffs, and thus accessible to all those interested. As such, he became the first teacher of Roman law (how students of law learned their material earlier is unknown).

References

241 BC deaths
People from the Metropolitan City of Rome Capital
3rd-century BC Roman consuls
Pontifices maximi of the Roman Republic
Ancient Roman generals
3rd-century BC clergy
Ancient Roman jurists
Coruncanii
Year of birth unknown